The Kongemose culture (Kongemosekulturen)  was a mesolithic hunter-gatherer culture in southern Scandinavia ca. 6000 BC–5200 BC  and the origin of the Ertebølle culture. It was preceded by the Maglemosian culture. In the north it bordered on the Scandinavian Nøstvet and Lihult cultures.

The Kongemose culture is named after a location in western Zealand and its typical form is known from Denmark and Skåne. The finds are characterised by long flintstone flakes, used for making characteristic rhombic arrowheads, scrapers, drills, awls, and toothed blades. Tiny micro blades constituted the edges of bone daggers that were often decorated with geometric patterns. Stone axes were made of a variety of stones, and other tools were made of horn and bone. The main economy was based on hunting red deer, roe deer, and wild boar, supplemented by fishing at the coastal settlements.

Genetics

References

Other sources

Clark, Grahame  (2009) The Earlier Stone Age Settlement of Scandinavia (Cambridge University Press) 

Archaeological cultures of Northern Europe
Archaeological cultures in Denmark
Archaeological cultures in Lithuania
Archaeological cultures in Sweden
Scandinavian archaeology
Nordic Stone Age
Mesolithic cultures of Europe
Lithics
6th-millennium BC establishments